John Henry Writer (born September 17, 1944) is a retired American rifle shooter. He competed in the 50 m three positions event at the 1968 and 1972 Olympics and won a silver and a gold medal, respectively.

Competing for West Virginia, Writer won the U.S. intercollegiate championships in 1964–1966 and the 1967 national title in smallbore rifle, three position. At the 1972 Olympics he set new world records in the total (1,166) and in the standing phase (381). Writer also won multiple medals at the Pan-American Games in 1967–1975 and at the world championships in 1970–1974.

Writer has been inducted into the USA Shooting Hall of fame.

References

External links

1944 births
Living people
Sportspeople from Chicago
American male sport shooters
United States Distinguished Marksman
ISSF rifle shooters
Shooters at the 1968 Summer Olympics
Shooters at the 1972 Summer Olympics
Olympic gold medalists for the United States in shooting
Olympic silver medalists for the United States in shooting
Medalists at the 1968 Summer Olympics
Medalists at the 1972 Summer Olympics
Pan American Games gold medalists for the United States
Pan American Games medalists in shooting
West Virginia Mountaineers rifle shooters
Shooters at the 1967 Pan American Games
Shooters at the 1971 Pan American Games
Shooters at the 1975 Pan American Games
Medalists at the 1967 Pan American Games
Medalists at the 1971 Pan American Games
Medalists at the 1975 Pan American Games